Kristen Talbot (born 24 November 1970) is an American female speed skater. She was a member of the US Olympic team at the 1988 Winter Olympics, 1992 Winter Olympics and 1994 Winter Olympics. She graduated from Skidmore College.

Talbot donated her bone marrow to her brother, Jason, who was severely affected by aplastic anemia, taking time away from her training for the 1994 Winter Olympics to do so.

References 

1970 births
Living people
American female speed skaters
Speed skaters at the 1988 Winter Olympics
Speed skaters at the 1992 Winter Olympics
Speed skaters at the 1994 Winter Olympics
Olympic speed skaters of the United States
Skidmore College alumni
21st-century American women